Fashion Hunters is an American reality television series which premiered on October 4, 2011, on Bravo. The series chronicles the life of several fashion designers working at Second Time Around as they go around New York City searching through the closets and attics of the city's elite. The cast includes Tara Muscarella, Karina Lepiner, Ambria Miscia and Wilson Payamps.

Episodes

References

External links 

 
 
 

2010s American reality television series
2011 American television series debuts
2011 American television series endings
Bravo (American TV network) original programming
English-language television shows
Fashion-themed television series